Corydoras simulatus is a tropical freshwater fish belonging to the Corydoradinae sub-family of the family Callichthyidae.  It originates in inland waters in South America, and is found in the Upper Meta River basin in Colombia.

The fish prefers clean, clear water with a current.  It will grow in length up to 1.9 inches (4.9 centimeters).  It lives in a tropical climate in water with a 6.0 – 8.0 pH, a water hardness of 2 – 25 dGH, and a temperature range of 68 – 77 °F (20 – 25 °C).  It feeds on worms, benthic crustaceans, insects, and plant matter.  It lays eggs in dense vegetation and adults do not guard the eggs.

See also
 List of freshwater aquarium fish species

References

External links
 Photos at Fishbase

Corydoras
Freshwater fish of Colombia
Taxa named by Stanley Howard Weitzman
Fish described in 1970